Xiaoheiqingella is a taxon of priapulid known from the Chengjiang biota; synonymous with Yunnanpriapulus, and thought to belong to the priapulid crown group.

References

Priapulida
Maotianshan shales fossils
Prehistoric protostome genera

Cambrian genus extinctions